Cindy Sofia Polo (born November 29, 1977) is a Democratic politician from Florida. She served one term in the Florida House of Representatives, representing the 103rd district in northwestern Miami-Dade and southwestern Broward Counties from 2018 to 2020.

Early life 

Cindy Sofia Polo was born in Providence, Rhode Island on November 29, 1977 to Ramon and Carmen Polo who left their homeland of Colombia in search of a better future for their young family.

Ramon worked for many years as a unionized foreman for Entenmann's, Carmen as a seamstress. The youngest of three children, Polo was the first to be born stateside. At the age of two, their family moved from Providence to Miami Lakes, Florida.

Career
Her professional career includes time with the Miami Heat and the Miami-Dade Expressway Authority as a Communications Director. For several years, Polo took a professional hiatus as she has dedicated her time and energy to raising her son, CJ. In February 2018, moved by the tragedy of the Parkland shooting, Polo filed to run for office as a Democratic candidate.

Although a clear underdog in a Republican district since 1998, she won the election on November 6, 2018. She secured 53%  of the vote while her closest rival Frank Mingo, a Republican candidate secured 47%. In August 2019, Republican Tom Fabricio announced his intention to run against Polo for the seat.

Polo's push to have Florida legislators vote to hold a special session discussing gun laws did not receive the appropriate amount to move forward.

Polo lost reelection in 2020 to Republican Tom Fabricio, who won 54–46%.

Personal life 
Polo is a member of the multicultural sorority Sigma Lambda Gamma.

Education 
Polo graduated from Hialeah-Miami Lakes Senior High School in 1995. In 2004, she earned a Bachelor of Science from Florida International University in Mass Communication and subsequently received her Master's Degree in Business Administration from the same institution.

References

Polo, Cindy
Living people
21st-century American politicians
21st-century American women politicians
American politicians of Colombian descent
Hispanic and Latino American state legislators in Florida
Hispanic and Latino American women in politics
Women state legislators in Florida
1977 births
Florida International University alumni